The Kissinger-Crookes Flying Saucer is a high-wing homebuilt glider based on the Amcraft Products model aircraft.

Design and development
The Flying Saucer is the first in a series of aircraft designs from Curtiss Kissinger, and LeRoy Crookes capable of carrying a pilot. It received a Patent No. 2,864,567.

The prototype was built using EMT electrical conduit. The wings use pine wood spars, and 1/8 inch plywood covering. The wing chord varies from center to tip to form a circular shape. The wings fold in segments for road travel.

Operational history
The flying saucer was towed aloft on flight tests with a Nash Rambler. The prototype suffered structural damage on the first flight tests.

Specifications (Kissinger-Crookes Flying Saucer)

References

Homebuilt aircraft